Toynton Fen Side is a hamlet and linear settlement on Fenside Road in the East Lindsey district of Lincolnshire, England. The hamlet is partly in the civil parish of Toynton St Peter, and that of Toynton All Saints. The East Fen Catchwater Drain crosses west to east at the south of the hamlet. Bus services connect Toynton Fen Side with Horncastle, Partney, Wainfleet, Boston, Mablethorpe, and Spilsby. Businesses include garage services and a fencing suppliers.

According to trade directories Toynton Fen Side is a centre for growing wheat, barley, potatoes and beans, and has rich pasture land. The settlement was historically under the lordship of the Willoughby de Eresby Barony; in 1855, Peter Drummond-Burrell; in 1885, Clementina Drummond-Willoughby. There was a publican of The Wheatsheaf public house in 1855. A farmer and a publican was mentioned in 1872, where the publican was also a grocer. In 1933 there were two farmers, a smallholder, and a shopkeeper. There was a Primitive Methodist Chapel, dating to 1867, in the Toynton All Saints part of the hamlet. The chapel was variously in the Louth, Spilsby, and Leake Circuits.

References

External links

"Toynton All Saints - Methodist (Primitive)", Genuki, Retrieved 18 March 2016

Hamlets in Lincolnshire
East Lindsey District